Zhu Xin (born February 26, 1993), also known as Rosie Zhu Xin, is a Chinese model and beauty pageant titleholder who was crowned Miss Universe China 2019. She represented China at the Miss Universe 2019 pageant.

Pageantry

Miss World China 2017 
Xin first competed in Miss World China 2017 and she was placed as a finalist.

Miss Intercontinental China 2018 
Officials of Miss Intercontinental China allowed Xin to participate in the Miss Intercontinental China 2018 pageant. She was placed as a Top 10 finalist.

Miss China 2019 
Xin represented Hebei at the Miss Universe China 2018 pageant held at Shenzhen and was crowned by her predecessor, Meisu Qin on January 14, 2019.

Miss Universe 2019 
Xin represented China at the Miss Universe 2019 pageant and failed to place.

References

External links
Official Miss Universe China website

1993 births
Living people
Chinese female models
Chinese beauty pageant winners
Miss Universe 2019 contestants